The 2017–18 Creighton Bluejays men's basketball team represented Creighton University in the 2017–18 NCAA Division I men's basketball season. The Bluejays were led by eighth-year head coach Greg McDermott and played their home games at the CenturyLink Center Omaha, as members of the Big East Conference. They finished the season 21–12, 10–8 in Big East play to finish in a three-way tie for third place. They lost in the quarterfinals of the Big East tournament to Providence. They received an at-large bid to the NCAA tournament as the No. 8 seed in the South Region. There the Bluejays lost in the first round to Kansas State.

Previous season
The Bluejays finished the 2016–17 season 25–10, 10–8 in Big East play to finish in a four-way tie for third place. In the Big East tournament, they defeated Providence and Xavier before losing to Villanova in the championship game. They received an at-large bid to the NCAA tournament as a No. 6 seed in the Midwest region. There they lost in the first round to No. 11-seeded Rhode Island.

Offseason

Departures

Incoming transfers

2017 recruiting class

2018 Recruiting class

Preseason
In a poll of Big East coaches at the conference media day, Creighton was picked to finish in fifth place. Junior guard Khyri Thomas was a preseason All-Big East Honorable Mention.

Roster

Schedule and results

|-
!colspan=9 style=| Exhibition

|-

|-
!colspan=9 style=| Regular season

|-
!colspan=9 style="|Big East tournament

|-
!colspan=9 style="|NCAA tournament

Rankings

^Coaches did not release a Week 2 poll.
*AP does not release post-NCAA tournament rankings

References

2017–18 Big East Conference men's basketball season
2017-18
Creighton
2018 in sports in Nebraska
2017 in sports in Nebraska